The 1936–37 League of Ireland was the sixteenth season of the League of Ireland. Bohemians were the defending champions.

Sligo Rovers won their first title, becoming the first team from Connacht to do so.

Overview
Reds United withdrew from the League voluntarily, with Shelbourne taking their place.

Teams

Table

Results

Top goalscorers

See also 

 1936–37 FAI Cup

Ireland
Lea
League of Ireland seasons